Terry Young was mayor of Tulsa, Oklahoma from 1984–1986.

Early life 
Young graduated Edison High School in 1966 and received an associate degree from Tulsa Community College.

Tulsa County Commissioner 
Young was appointed as county commissioner of Tulsa County's second district in 1976 and was later elected to a full term that year. He was reelected in 1978 and 1982.

Mayor of Tulsa 
In 1984, Young was elected Mayor of Tulsa by a 924 vote margin against incumbent mayor Jim Inhofe. He served one term as mayor between 1984 and 1986. He negotiated the land exchange with the Department of Housing and Urban Development to build OSU-Tulsa and allocated $10 million dollars to expand the Gilcrease Museum.

As mayor, he created a flood control program in response to the 1984 flood. The program was controversial because of its home buyout element.

Electoral History

References

1948 births
County commissioners in Oklahoma
Living people
Mayors of Tulsa, Oklahoma
Oklahoma Democrats